Pierre Essers (born 20 February 1959 in Maastricht, Netherlands) is a Dutch former professional footballer who played as a striker or midfielder.

Much-travelled Essers played for clubs in his native Maasticht as well as in Belgium, France, Germany, England and Australia.

See also
Football in Netherlands
List of football clubs in the Netherlands

References

External links
Pierre Essers at Kent u deze nog? 

1959 births
Living people
Association football forwards
Association football midfielders
Dutch footballers
MVV Maastricht players
K. Patro Eisden Maasmechelen players
R. Charleroi S.C. players
K.F.C. Diest players
Bourges 18 players
FC 08 Homburg players
Walsall F.C. players
English Football League players
2. Bundesliga players
National Soccer League (Australia) players
Dutch expatriate footballers
Expatriate footballers in Belgium
Expatriate footballers in France
Expatriate footballers in Germany
Expatriate footballers in England
Expatriate soccer players in Australia
Dutch expatriate sportspeople in Belgium
Dutch expatriate sportspeople in France
Dutch expatriate sportspeople in Germany
Dutch expatriate sportspeople in England
Dutch expatriate sportspeople in Australia
Newcastle Breakers FC players
Footballers from Maastricht